Joseph Mordaunt Crook,  (born 27 February 1937), generally known as J. Mordaunt Crook, is an English architectural historian and specialist on the Georgian and Victorian periods. He is an authority on the life and work of the Victorian architect William Burges, his biography published in 1981, and reissued in 2013, has been described as "one of the most substantial studies of any Victorian architect".

Positions and memberships held

 Slade Professor of Fine Art, University of Oxford (1979–1980)
 Professor of Architectural History, Royal Holloway College, (University of London), (1981–1999)
 President of the Society of Architectural Historians of Great Britain
 Supernumerary Fellow of Brasenose College, Oxford
 Member of the Supervisory Committee of the Oxford Dictionary of National Biography
 Council Member of the Society of Antiquaries of London
 Council Member of the Victorian Society of Great Britain
 Vice Chairman Westminster Abbey Fabric Commission

Honours
 Commander of the Order of the British Empire (CBE) (2003)
 Alice Davis Hitchcock Medallion, (1974), Society of Architectural Historians of Great Britain
 Fellow of the British Academy (FBA)

Selected works

 The History of the King's Works volumes V-VI (1972-6) HMSO
 The British Museum: a Case-study in Architectural Politics (1972), Pelican
 The Greek Revival: Neo-Classical Attitudes in British Architecture 1760-1870 (1972/revised 1995) John Murray
 The Reform Club (1973) article for and published by the Reform Club
 Strawberry Hill Revisited Reprints from Country Life of 7/14/21 June 1973
 William Burges and the High Victorian Dream (1981) John Murray; revised (2013) Frances Lincoln
 The Strange Genius of William Burges (1981) National Museum of Wales
 Axel Haig and the Victorian Vision of the Middle Ages (with C.A. Lennox-Boyd) (1984) George Allen & Unwin
 John Carter and the Mind of the Gothic Revival (1985) Society of Antiquaries of London, Occasional Papers
 The Dilemma of Style: Architectural Ideas from the Picturesque to the Post-Modern (1989) John Murray
 The Rise of the Nouveaux Riches: Style and Status in Victorian and Edwardian Architecture (1999) John Murray
 London's Arcadia: John Nash and the Planning of Regent's Park  (date of publication and publisher unknown)
 The Architect's Secret: Victorian Critics and the Image of Gravity (2003) John Murray
 Brasenose: The Biography of an Oxford College (Oxford: Oxford University Press, 2008)
 Brooks's 1764-2014: The Story of a Whig Club (Edited with Charles Sebag-Montefiore)  London: Paul Holberton, 2013

References

Sources
 
 

1937 births
Living people
Fellows of the British Academy
Commanders of the Order of the British Empire
British architecture writers
British architectural historians
Slade Professors of Fine Art (University of Oxford)
Fellows of Brasenose College, Oxford
Academics of Royal Holloway, University of London
Fellows of the Society of Antiquaries of London